Mandwal is a village in Bilaspur tehsil, Banda district, Azimgarh, Haryana in India.People living in the village is 3000 3500 source of income of village is farming Mandwal name of sommra rao

Soomra sainswal Sardars 

1026 – 1053: Soomar bin Rao Soomar Parmar
1053 – 1068: Bhungar I bin Khafif I Soomro
1068 – 1092: Dodo I bin Bhungar Soomro
1092 – 1098: Zenav Tari Sultana bint Dodo I Soomro (d/o Sardar Dodo I)
1098 – 1107: Sanghar bin Dodo I Soomro
1107 – 1107 : Hamun Sultana (w/o Sardar Sanghar)
1107 – 1142: Khafif II bin Soomar bin Dodo I Soomro
1142 – 1181: Umar I bin Soomar bin Dodo I Soomro
1181 – 1195: Dodo II Bin Khafif II Soomro
1195 – 1222: Bhungar II bin Chanesar bin Hamir bin Dodo I Soomro
1222 – 1228: Chanesar I bin Bhungar II Soomro (first reign)
1228 – 1236: Ganhwar I bin Bhungar II Soomro (first reign)
1236 – 1237: Chanesar I bin Bhungar II Soomro (second reign)
1237 – 1241: Ganhwar I bin Bhungar II Soomro (second reign)
1241 – 1256: Muhammad Tur bin Ganhwar I Soomro
1256 – 1259: Ganhwar II bin Muhammad Tur Soomro
1259 – 1273: Dodo III bin Ganhwar II Soomro
1273 – 1283: Tai bin Dodo III Soomro
1283 – 1300: Chanesar II bin Dodo III Soomro
1300 – 1315: Bhungar III bin Chanesar II Soomro
1315 – 1333: Khafif III bin Chanesar II Soomro
1333 – 1350: Dodo IV bin Khafif III Soomro
1333 – 1350: Umar II bin Khafif III Soomro
1333 – 1350: Bhungar IV bin Khafif III Soomro
1333 – 1356: Hamir bin Dodo IV Soomro

Soomra Sardars of Umerkot Sindh 

1356 – 1390: Umar III bin Hamir Soomro

References

Villages in Banda district, India